Elliott Quow (born March 3, 1962) is a retired track and field sprinter from the United States, who was the 4th-ranked 200 meter runner in the world in 1983, only behind Carl Lewis, Calvin Smith and then world record holder Pietro Mennea.  During that year he won the 200 meters at the NCAA Men's Outdoor Track and Field Championships while running for Rutgers University, the World Student Games, the Pan American Games and finished the season off with a silver medal at the inaugural 1983 World Championships, behind Smith but ahead of Mennea.  He only returned to the world rankings one more time, two years later.

In 1995 he was named to the Rutgers University Olympic Sports Hall of Fame

Achievements

References

 

1962 births
Living people
American male sprinters
Rutgers Scarlet Knights men's track and field athletes
Place of birth missing (living people)
Pan American Games gold medalists for the United States
Athletes (track and field) at the 1983 Pan American Games
Pan American Games medalists in athletics (track and field)
World Athletics Championships medalists
Universiade medalists in athletics (track and field)
Universiade silver medalists for the United States
World Athletics Championships athletes for the United States
Medalists at the 1983 Summer Universiade
Medalists at the 1983 Pan American Games